Habakkuk 2:4 is the fourth verse of the second chapter of the book of Habakkuk. Habakkuk 2:4 was quoted by the Apostle Paul in the book of Romans and Galatians, it also became one of the most important verses that were used as foundations of the doctrines of the Protestant reformation.

Text
The original text was written in Hebrew language.

Textual witnesses
Some early manuscripts containing the text of this verse in Hebrew language are found among the Dead Sea Scrolls, i.e., 1QpHab, known as the "Habakkuk Commentary" (later half of the 1st century BC), and of the Masoretic Text tradition, which includes Codex Cairensis (895 CE), the Petersburg Codex of the Prophets (916), Aleppo Codex (10th century), Codex Leningradensis (1008). Fragments containing parts of this verse in Hebrew were found among the Dead Sea Scrolls, including 4Q82 (4QXIIg; 25 BCE).

Extant ancient manuscripts of the Septuagint version, a translation into Koine Greek made in the last few centuries BC, include Codex Vaticanus (B; B; 4th century), Codex Sinaiticus (S; BHK: S; 4th century), Codex Alexandrinus (A; A; 5th century) and Codex Marchalianus (Q; Q; 6th century). Fragments containing parts of this verse in Greek were found among the Dead Sea Scrolls, that is, Naḥal Ḥever 8Ḥev1 (8ḤevXIIgr); late 1st century BCE).

Content
In the Masoretic Text of Leningrad Codex it reads:

Transliteration
  -  bōw
wə- be- 

In the King James version of the bible it reads:

Behold, his soul which is lifted up is not upright in him:
but the just shall live by his faith.

In the New International Version of the bible it reads:

See, the enemy is puffed up; his desires are not upright
but the righteous person will live by his faithfulness.

Analysis 
"But the just shall live by his faith" is translated from the Hebrew (consisting of three words in Masoretic Text) וצדיק באמונתו יחיה (Transliteration: we-tza-dik be-e-mo-na-to yeh-yeh). This part is quoted in three verses of the New Testament: Romans 1:17, Galatians 3:11, and Hebrews 10:38. In the Epistle to the Romans and Galatians Paul extends Habakkuk's original concept of righteous living at the present time into a future life, whereas in Epistle to the Hebrews Habakkuk's vision is tied to Christ and used to comfort the church during a period of persecution. These three epistles are considered to be "the three great doctrinal books of the New Testament," and Habakkuk's statement concerning faith forms the backbone of each book.

There is controversy about the translation of the verse, the word "emunah" is most often translated as "faithfulness", though the word in this verse has been traditionally translated as "faith".

The word "emunah" is not translated as "belief" in any other verse than Habakkuk 2:4,  Clendenen, E. Ray defended the translation of the word as "faith" on the basis of the context of the verse, arguing that it refers to Genesis 15:6, which used the word "he’ĕmin"  'believed' of which "’ĕmȗnāh" is derived from, he also argued that the Qumran community likely understood the verse as referring to faith instead of faithfulness.

Interpretation 
Martin Luther believed that Habakkuk 2:4 taught the doctrine of faith alone, commenting on the verse "For this is a general saying applicable to all of God's words. These must be believed, whether spoken at the beginning, middle, or end of the world".

The Essenes in the Qumran community likely understood the verse to be about faith in the Teacher of Righteousness.

Rashi interpreted the verse to be about Jeconiah.

The Targum interpreted the verse as "The wicked think that all these things are not so, but the righteous live by the truth of them".

Pseudo-Ignatius understood the verse to be about faith.

References

Sources

 
 
 
 
 

04